"Endangered Species" is a 2007 comic book storyline published by Marvel Comics. Starring the X-Men, it ran from June to October 2007. It begins with the Endangered Species one-shot written by Mike Carey and drawn by Scot Eaton.

The storyline, following up on the events of "House of M" and "Decimation", focuses on the Beast and explains why some mutants have retained their superpowers.

The story is composed of a one-shot and 17 eight-page back-up stories spread across the X-Men, Uncanny X-Men, X-Factor and New X-Men titles, starting with X-Men #200. It acts as a prelude to a major story arc starting in October 2007 called "Messiah Complex".

Tagline
"Witness the death of a species..."

Plot summary
The X-Men and various other mutants attend the funeral of a young mutant boy named Landru who has been killed in a road traffic accident and muse on what this means for mutantkind.

Beast plans to find a way to reverse M-Day. After he was unable to attain a solution  he seeks the help of some of the world's most dangerous supervillain geniuses. Hank travels to Transia in search of the High Evolutionary, who discusses the possibility that science cannot undo something that magic ultimately caused. However he ultimately seems uninterested in helping. He does hint that Hank is not the first person to travel to Wundagore looking for a solution to the M-Day problem, nor the first to be dissatisfied with his answers.

Hank next receives an offer from Kavita Rao: with mutants as an endangered species, her research into depowering mutants has become pointless. Tissue samples from all the mutants that she depowered turned to dust on M-Day. She gives Hank her notes and lab and returns to India. Beast travels to the Neverland facility, whose mutant prisoners are revealed to have been killed after the facility was shut down by Weapon X. He discovers Dark Beast, who offers his help. Hank reluctantly accepts under the condition that the Dark Beast follows Hank's orders.

Dark Beast convinces Hank to take a serum of his own "liquid memory", wherein Hank experiences several of the Dark Beast's memories. After experiencing the atrocities Dark Beast committed, Hank declares him insane. They arrive at a nuclear power plant in Alamogordo, New Mexico, that once served as a research facility for the "study" of mutations by an organization known as "Project: Black Womb", which was devoted to the vivisection of newborn mutants with evident signs of mutation.

After realizing how the disappearance of the X-gene rendered such research null and void, Dark Beast suggests going to Genosha, scavenging dead mutant corpses. After extensive examination, Hank realizes that even if the X-gene was expunged from the world mutant population, many of them retained some of their altered body features. He proposes to Dark Beast that an artificial X-gene may be created through donation from the remaining living mutants and the dead mutants who still remained powered. They embark on a comparative analysis of depowered mutants, before and after the M-Day, to be able to comprehend the very nature of mutation itself, which Hank plans to do by first discovering how to keep old samples viable by examining the contraband drug Mutant Growth Hormone. With the aid of Bishop, Beast meets with an MGH dealer in District X, a former mutant ghetto, only to discover that if a donor mutant has been depowered, any MGH distilled from that mutant was also depowered.

Having realized that all mutants from alternate timelines- including Bishop, Cable, and Rachel Summers- retained their powers, Hank goes to see Forge, who reveals that he scanned alternate timelines known to have mutants with his equipment and has found that no more mutants exist in any of them, suggesting that those timelines have either been erased or altered.

Deciding to look into the parents of several mutants in the hopes of isolating chromosomes in order to create an artificial X-gene,
Hank and the Dark Beast travel to the Guthrie home in Kentucky. Hank is unable to procure a blood sample from Mrs. Guthrie due to her fear of her remaining children becoming mutants and dying like their older siblings. At the same time, the Dark Beast coerces one of the younger children into taking an untested antidote to activate his latent X-gene. This causes the boy to fall into a coma with hives covering his arms. The two Beasts start to fight until Mrs. Guthrie shoots the Dark Beast with a shotgun. Hank saves the boy's life.

Some time afterwards, Spiral teleports to Hank and claims that Mojo is displeased with the fact that mutants are now an endangered species, which will affect his television ratings. Spiral advises him that when science can't help, magic might be a solution.

Hank goes to see Doctor Strange, who shows him the true depth of the Scarlet Witch's spell: it has woven itself through billions of people and countless other worlds and dimensions. Hank asks if the spell can be reversed, and Strange replies that with enough preparation and assistance, it is possible. But as the spell is now, he claimed even trying to break it could cause reality to implode upon itself. Hank and Doctor Strange travel through alternate realities to find an answer but cannot find one.

With no other options available, Beast travels to Transia where he meets Wanda Maximoff on the streets, however, she claims to not remember anything of her life as the Scarlet Witch. Instead, Wanda tells him a story warning of the dangers of getting what you wish for. Beast, having made no progress on his search, returns to Neverland and gives all the corpses a separate burial.

Publication

June 2007

Endangered Species one-shot
Part 1: X-Men (vol. 2) #200

July 2007

Part 2: Uncanny X-Men #488 
Part 3: X-Factor #21 
Part 4: New X-Men (vol 2) #40
Part 5: X-Men (vol 2) #201

August 2007

Part 6: Uncanny X-Men #489
Part 7: X-Factor #22 
Part 8: New X-Men (vol 2) #41 
Part 9: X-Men (vol 2) #202

September 2007

Part 10: Uncanny X-Men #490
Part 11: X-Factor #23 
Part 12: New X-Men (vol 2) #42
Part 13: X-Men (vol 2) #203

October 2007

Part 14: Uncanny X-Men #491 
Part 15: X-Factor #24 
Part 16/17: X-Men #204

Note: New X-Men #43, originally scheduled to contain Part 16, was delayed, so the part is contained in X-Men #204 along with 17.

Collected editions
The one-shot and the seventeen, eight-page back-up stories have been collected into a single trade paperback (comics) volume):

 X-Men: Endangered Species (192 pages, hardcover, February 2008 , softcover, August 2008)

References